The Josef Jacobberger House at 1502 SW Upper Hall Street in Portland, Oregon was designed and built during 1906–07.  It was listed on the National Register of Historic Places in 1990.  It was a work of architect Joseph Jacobberger to serve as his own residence.  Stained glass windows flanking its front door and elsewhere in the house are believed to be works by the firm of David L. Povey.

See also
Joseph Jacobberger Country House

References

Houses on the National Register of Historic Places in Portland, Oregon
Tudor Revival architecture in Oregon
Houses completed in 1906
1906 establishments in Oregon
Joseph Jacobberger buildings
Arts and Crafts architecture in Oregon
Goose Hollow, Portland, Oregon
Portland Historic Landmarks